St. Giles' Church, Costock is a parish church in the Church of England in Costock, Nottinghamshire.

The church is Grade II listed by the Department for Digital, Culture, Media and Sport as it is a building of special architectural or historic interest.

History
The church was medieval but a north aisle was added in 1848 by G. G. Place and it was restored in 1862 by Gilbert Scott.

Current parish status
It is in a group of parishes which includes:
St Giles' Church, Costock
St Mary's Church, East Leake
All Saints' Church, Rempstone
St Helena's Church, West Leake
Church of St John the Baptist, Stanford on Soar

Sources

Costock